Bernhard Abraham (1886 – ) was a German gymnast. He competed in the 1906 Summer Olympics.

References

External links

1886 births
Gymnasts at the 1906 Intercalated Games
German male artistic gymnasts
Olympic gymnasts of Germany
Year of death missing